Dominik Dvořák (born  in Prague) is a Czech bobsledder.

Dvořák competed at the 2014 Winter Olympics for the Czech Republic. He teamed with driver Jan Vrba, Dominik Suchý and Michal Vacek in the four-man event, finishing 16th.

As of April 2014, his best showing at the World Championships is 12th, in the 2013 four-man event.

Dvořák made his World Cup debut in December 2012. As of April 2014, his best finish is 12th, in a four-man event in 2012-13 at Igls.

References

1992 births
Living people
Olympic bobsledders of the Czech Republic
Sportspeople from Prague
Bobsledders at the 2014 Winter Olympics
Bobsledders at the 2018 Winter Olympics
Bobsledders at the 2022 Winter Olympics
Czech male bobsledders